Nosratabad (also Romanized as Noşratābād) is a village in Sheykh Musa Rural District, in the Central District of Aqqala County, Golestan Province, Iran. At the 2006 census, its population was 794, in 168 families.

References 

Populated places in Aqqala County